The 1956 season of the Primera División Peruana, the top category of Peruvian football, was played by 10 teams. The national champions were Sporting Cristal.

Results

Standings

External links 
 Peru 1956 season at RSSSF
 Peruvian Football League News 

Peru1
1956 in Peruvian football
Peruvian Primera División seasons